Gilles George Cloutier,  (June 27, 1928 – May 13, 2014) was a Canadian physicist and former director of the Alberta Research Council.

Early life and education

Born in Quebec City, he was educated at Université Laval and McGill University.

Career

He was rector of the Université de Montréal from 1985 to 1993.

He died in 2014 at the age of 85.

Honours
 In 1976, he was made a Fellow of the Royal Society of Canada. 
 In 1981, he made an Officer of the Order of Canada.
 In 1983, he was awarded an honorary Doctor of Science from the University of Alberta.
 In 1989, he was made an Officer of the National Order of Quebec.
 In 1993, he was promoted to Companion of the Order of Canada.
 He was appointed to the Canada Foundation for Innovation.

References

External links
 Canadian Who's Who 1997 entry
 

1928 births
2014 deaths
Canadian physicists
Canadian university and college chief executives
Companions of the Order of Canada
Fellows of the Royal Society of Canada
French Quebecers
Officers of the National Order of Quebec
People from Quebec City
Academics in Quebec
McGill University alumni
Scientists from Quebec
20th-century Canadian scientists
21st-century Canadian scientists
Université Laval alumni
Presidents of the Canadian Association of Physicists